Oleksandr Perenchuk (born 30 January 1966) is a former Ukrainian football defender.

References

External links
 
 Player - Oleksandr Ivanovych Perenchuk (Игрок - Александр Иванович Перенчук). Luhansk Our Football portal.

1966 births
Living people
Ukrainian footballers
FC Ros Bila Tserkva players
FC Khimik Severodonetsk players
SC Korosten players
FC Nyva Myronivka players
FC Fakel Varva players
FC Paperovyk Malyn players
FC Bucha players
FC Dnipro Kyiv players
Ukrainian Cup top scorers
Association football defenders